Lerman is an Ashkenazi Jewish surname. It may refer to:

Anita Lerman (born 1944), American politician 
Antony Lerman (born 1946), a British writer who specializes in the study of antisemitism and the Israeli-Palestinian conflict
April Lerman (born 1969), American actress
 Bruce Lerman, American cardiologist; Chief of the Division of Cardiology and Director of the Cardiac Electrophysiology Laboratory at Weill Cornell Medicine and the New York Presbyterian Hospital
Diego Lerman (born 1976), Argentine film director, producer and screenwriter
Dragutin Lerman (1863-1918), Croatian explorer
Eleanor Lerman, American poet, novelist, and short story writer
Jonathan Lerman (born 1987), American artist
Kristina Lerman (born 1967), American network scientist
Leo Lerman (1914-1994), American writer and editor
Leonard Lerman, American biologist
Logan Lerman (born 1992), American actor
Miles Lerman (1920-2008), American activist
Oscar Lerman (1919-1992), American nightclub and gallery owner, and film producer

See also
Lehrman (disambiguation)

References

Jewish surnames
Yiddish-language surnames